Guayabal may refer to:
Guayabal, Azua, a town in the Azua province of the Dominican Republic
Guayabal, Independencia, a town in the Independencia province of the Dominican Republic
El Guayabal, a town in Veracruz, Mexico
Guayabal de Síquima, a town in Cundinamarca Department in Colombia
Guayabal, a lake in Puerto Rico
Guayabal, Panama
Armero (Armero-Guayabal), a municipality in Tolima Department, central Colombia
Guayabal (Medellin)
 San José Guayabal